The discography of Sherbet, including releases under the names Highway and The Sherbs, consists of ten studio albums, thirty-eight singles, one extended play, eleven compilation albums, three live albums and two video album/DVDs.

By February 1979, the band had amassed a total of six platinum and five gold albums in Australia.

Studio albums

Live albums

Compilation albums

Notes
° Australian Music DVD Chart.

Extended plays

Singles

DVDs

References

External links

Sherbet / The Sherbs archived from the original on 27 November 2013 at Australian Rock Database. Retrieved 1 March 2014.
Sherbet, Highway, Sherbs at Discogs

Sherbet, Sherbs at Rate Your Music

Discographies of Australian artists
Rock music group discographies